2 Ozs of Plastic with a Hole in the Middle is the second studio album by the Welsh rock band Man and was released in September 1969.

Track listing
Source: Discogs

Personnel 
 Michael "Micky" Jones – lead guitar, vocals
 Roger "Deke" Leonard – guitar, harp, piano, harpsichord, percussion, vocals
 Clive John – organ, piano, guitar, vocals
 Ray Williams – bass, vocals
 Jeff Jones – drums, percussion
 "Plug" – drums on "parchment and candles"

Production 
 Producer – John Schroeder
 Engineers – Howard Barrow, Alan Florence & Brian Humphries
 Liner notes – Dinnes Cruickshank

Re-releases 
2 Ozs of Plastic with a Hole in the Middle was re-released on CD in May 2009 (Esoteric Eclec 2128) including 3 bonus tracks:-
 "My Name Is Jesus Smith" (Alternative version)
 "A Sad Song" (Grasshopper)
 "Walkin' the Dogma" ("Spunk Box" demo) 
The original album has also been re-released on two CD compilations:-
 The Dawn of Man (1997) Recall SMD CD 124
 The Definitive Collection (1998) Castle CCSCD 832.
Both these compilations also include Man's previous album Revelation and bonus singles.

References

External links 
 
 Man - 2 Ozs of Plastic with a Hole in the Middle (1969) album review by Paul Collins, credits & releases at AllMusic.com
 Man - 2 Ozs of Plastic with a Hole in the Middle (1969) album releases & credits at Discogs.com
 Man - 2 Ozs of Plastic with a Hole in the Middle (1969) album credits & user reviews at ProgArchives.com
 Man - 2 Ozs of Plastic with a Hole in the Middle (1969) album to be listened as stream at Spotify.com on compilation And in the Beginning... The Complete Early Man 1968-69

1969 albums
Man (band) albums
Dawn Records albums
Albums produced by John Schroeder (musician)